The Children's Channel, also known as TCC, was a British-based pan-European children's television channel in Europe, the Middle East and Africa, which was owned by Flextech in London, England, UK. It began broadcasting on the original Eutelsat satellite on 1 September 1984.

History

Early years
The Children's Channel was launched on the original Eutelsat satellite on 1 September 1984, almost exclusively to cable households owing to the low proliferation of domestic satellite dishes in Europe, the Middle East and Africa at the time, and originally operated by Starstream who were backed by British Telecom, DC Thomson, Thames Television and Thorn EMI.

In March 1989, The Children's Channel started airing free-to-air on the SES-owned Astra 1A satellite, airing from 5.00am to 10.00am on weekdays and from 5.00am to 12.00pm on weekends, time-sharing with Lifestyle. Following the launch of the Astra 1B satellite in 1991, The Children's Channel expanded to broadcast until 7.00pm each day, time-sharing with JSTV. In 1990, Flextech acquired its first stake in the company, beating United Artists Cable International to gain a stake. In 1991, United bought its own stake in The Children's Channel and won the management contract to run it. In late 1993, Flextech held talks with Tele-Communications and acquired TCI's European programming business in exchange for shares, giving TCI a 50%-60% stake in the enlarged Flextech group. The deal was completed which resulted in Flextech increasing its stake from 50.1% to 75%.

Change of ownership
In 1992, The Children's Channel launched an evening block showing programming of greater interest to older children and teenagers. The segment, called simply TCC, aired from 5.00pm to 7.00pm, and featured a number of home-produced programmes, such as CDQ and TVFM, as well as American imports including Saved by the Bell. During the day, The Children's Channel continued targeting younger children, and a large amount of its programming output was still archive animated series from the 1980s. As time went on, the TCC block extended its hours, initially starting half an hour earlier at 4.30pm, until the focus on teen programmes eventually became more prominent across The Children's Channel, which became known as TCC all day long. The demographic shift repositioned the channel away from its newly established competitors Nickelodeon UK and Cartoon Network Europe, to a market not adequately covered by others.

On 1 September 1993, it cut back its air hours to 6.00am to 5.00pm, allowing Family Channel to share its space with The Children's Channel, now a subscription service on the Astra 1A satellite via the Sky Multichannels package. By 5 June 1995, Flextech completed its acquisition of The Children's Channel when it acquired the remaining 25.1% stake in Starstream for £15 million.

In mid-1996, Flextech were in talks with Fox and News Corp to sell off a 50% stake in The Children's Channel; however, extremely lengthy negotiations made it impossible to secure a deal. Flextech tried to undertake negotiations to secure a different form of investment in The Children's Channel, but decided to refocus on the teen and youth markets instead. News Corp went on to launch Fox Kids in a joint venture with sister company Sky. This strongly affected TCC as they no longer had access to most of Fox and Saban Entertainment's library. On 3 February 1997, all the programmes targeting older children was by then airing were split off into Trouble with TCC reverted to the original name of The Children's Channel and continuing to screen programmes for younger children, running side by side with Trouble.

On 3 April 1998, the original pan-European operations of The Children's Channel on Eutelsat's Hot Bird both unexpectedly and silently closed after 14 years. Ratings had fallen massively due to competitors Nickelodeon UK, Cartoon Network Europe, Disney Channel UK and Fox Kids UK launching within three years of each other, reducing TCC's viewer share to 0.2% by its closure. The exodus of teen programmes to Trouble only accelerated its decline. Flextech officially stated that it only wished to focus on the teen market, and there were "so many other channels designed for [TCC's former target audience]". After the closure, Trouble's hours expanded to start at 7.00am. Upon the closure of the pan-regional TCC Europe channel, Cable & Wireless carried the localized TCC Nordic feed for a few months due to the company's anger at the closure of TCC at such short notice. On 5 October 1998, it was taken off the service and its slot was filled by Fox Kids.

However, due to a pre-agreed contract signed some years before to air The Children's Channel in Scandinavia until October 2000, Flextech created an advertisement-free version of TCC known as TCC Nordic to fulfil this requirement to air until 2000 as arranged before finally ceasing transmission. As this service was only fulfilling a contractual requirement, it was totally automated and showed exactly the same four weeks of programming on a constant loop where technical difficulties were frequent. On 30 September 2000, when the Nordic feed's contract expired, TCC closed entirely, more than two years after the original channel's closure. The website stayed running until late 2005.

Tiny TCC/Living
On 11 September 1995, The Children's Channel introduced a strand for toddlers and preschoolers called Tiny TCC, which aired every morning from 6.00am until 9.00am. This block was then transferred over to UK Living on 3 February 1997 and renamed Tiny Living with its airtimes being changed to 7.00–9.00am on weekdays, and 7.00–10.00am during the weekend. Following the unexpected closedown of its original pan-European operations on Eutelsat's Hot Bird on 3 April 1998, and full replacement by then-timeshared channel Trouble the next day, the strand was finally withdrawn on 1 January 2006.

Programming
In its day, TCC created some original programming. Connect 4 and The Super Mario Challenge were popular tea-time quiz shows. Some other 'in-between' show segments included Link Anchorman, featuring Chuck the Chimp and Hopper the Penguin. All of the puppets were created and performed by Hands Up Puppets, primarily Marcus Clarke and Helena Smee. Other TV talent made an appearance or got an early break working on these series, including Konnie Huq, then awaiting news of her university place.

Some of today's TV producers also got valuable early TV introduction experience on these series including Lisa Opie, Tim Lowe, Karen Ward, and Mike Crosby. A live-action quiz programme, Around the World in 80 Seconds, was produced for the channel in 1993–94. Hosted by Timmy Mallett as Captain Everything, schoolchildren participated in a quiz based on geography and general knowledge of particular countries, before "replaying" famous scenarios from the history of their chosen country. The top team received a prize of a four-day trip to the then-new Euro Disney.

During school holidays, Ratkan aired 7.00am-12.00pm, with It's Droibee Time off air.

0–9
 10+2

A–G

 A.J.'s Time Travelers
 The Adventures of Black Beauty
 The Adventures of Blinky Bill
 The Adventures of Crumbcake
 The Adventures of Dynamo Duck
 Adventures of Niko
 Adventures of Sonic the Hedgehog
 The Adventures of Spot
 The Adventures of T-Rex
 The Adventures of Teddy Ruxpin
 Alfred J. Kwak
 The Amazing Adventures of Morph
 The Amazing Live Sea Monkeys
 Animated Classic Showcase
 Anna Banana
 Around the World in 80 Seconds
 Arthur
 Astro Farm
 Art Attack (original series)
 Aubrey
 The Baby-Sitters Club
 Bad Level 10
 Bananaman
 Barnen
 The Bartons
 Batman
 BattleTech: The Animated Series
 Beakman's World
 Bits and Pieces
 The Beano's Dennis the Menace and Gnasher Show
 Beverly Hills Teens
 The Big Dish (game show)
 Bill and Ted's Excellent Adventures
 Blackstar
 Blast
 Blinky Bill
 Blue, Child of the Earth
 The Blunders
 Bobby's World
 Bobobobs
 Bojan the Bear
 Boogies Diner
 The Bots Master
 Bouli
 Boy Dominic
 Bravestarr
 Bright Sparks
 Bucky O'Hare
 Budgie the Little Helicopter
 Bulldozer
 Bunny with Chequered Ears
 Bullerbyn
 By Way of the Stars
 Byker Grove
 Cable Cook
 Cable News
 Cadillacs and Dinosaurs
 California Dreams
 California Raisins
 Captain N: The Game Master
 Captain Pugwash
 Cartoon Classics
 Casper and Friends
 The Castle of Adventure
 Cats & Company
 The Chestnut Soldier
 Chicken Minute
 Children of the Luna
 Clémentine
 The Clifton House Mystery
 The Club Cafe
 Clutz
 C.L.Y.D.E.	
 The Computer Show
 C.O.P.S.
 Cool Cartoons
 Cool McCool
 The Colours of World
 Cococinel
 Connect 4
 Costa
 Count Duckula
 Crack The Code
 Cuckoo: Omnibus
 CurioCity
 Cybernet
 Danger Mouse (original series)
 Decimal the Whale
 Defenders of the Earth
 Degrassi Junior High
 Dennis
 Dennis the Menace
 Denver, the Last Dinosaur
 Derrou
 Derrou Juniors
 Derrou Tales
 Dino Babies
 Dino-Riders
 Dish of the Day
 Diplodos
 Dog City
 The Dr Fad Show
 Dr. Snuggles
 The Dreamstone
 Dungeons and Dragons
 Dynamo Duck
 Earthworks
 Earthworm Jim (co-production with Universal Cartoon Studios)
 Eek! The Cat
 Emil I Lonneberga
 Emlyn's Moon
 Enchanted Pencil
 Ernest the Vampire
 Escape from Jupiter
 Fame
 A Fantastic Competition
 The Fantastic Voyages of Sinbad the Sailor
 Fifteen
 The Finder
 FishTales
 Flash Gordon
 The Flockton Flyer
 Floradora
 Foo Foo
 Fred Basset
 Fun Factor 10
 Fun House
 Galaxy High
 Garfield and Friends
 The Get Along Gang
 Get Your Own Back
 Gigantor
 The Girl From Tomorrow / Tomorrow's End
 Grasshopper Island
 Gravedale High
 Greedysaurus and Gangtape
 The Greedysaurus Gang
 Groovie Goolies
 Gustavus
 The Guys Next Door

H–N

 Halfway Across the Galaxy and Turn Left
 Hang Time
 Happily Ever After: Fairy Tales for Every Child
 The Happy Prince
 Head to Head
 Heartbreak High
 Heathcliff
 He-Man and the Masters of the Universe
 Henry's Cat
 Here Comes the Grump
 Home
 Hotshots
 How Things Work
 Hunter's Gold
 Ike and Webber
 Inspector Gadget (original series)
 Inspector Nasy
 Intelsat Close
 Interbang
 Into the Labyrinth
 Iznogoud
 Jayce and the Wheeled Warriors
 Jem
 Jim Henson's Animal Show
 John Ross
 Kaboodle
 King Koopa's Kool Kartoons
 Kissyfur
 Koleto and Murr
 Krazy Kat
 The Legend of Prince Valiant
 The Little Prince
 Little Wizards
 The Littles
 Little Brrm
 Little Dog
 Lotta
 Lucky Luke
 Ludwig
 Madeline
 Madison
 Magic Corner
 Make Music Fun
 M.A.S.K.
 Manu
 The Marvel Superheroes
 Michael Valiant
 Molly
 Mr. Bogus
 Mr Majeika
 Mr. Rossi
 My Little Pony and Friends
 The Mysterious Cities of Gold
 The New Adventures of Black Beauty
 The New Adventures of Gigantor
 The New Adventures of He-Man
 The New Archies
 New Kids on the Block
 The New Steve and Danny Show
 Noah and Nelly in... SkylArk
 Noozles
 Non-Stop Cartoon Capers
 Nursery Rhymes

O–U

 Ocean Odyssey
 Okavango
 Once Upon a Time... Space
 Open House
 Oscar's Orchestra
 Ovide and the Gang
 Paddington Bear
 Pettson and Findus
 Picture Pages
 Pingu	
 The Pink Panther
 Popeye
 Pugwall
 Pugwall's Summer
 Quick & Flupke
 Radar Men from the Moon
 Rainbow Brite
 Rainbow Theatre
 Rambo: The Force of Freedom
 Ready or Not
 The Real Ghostbusters
 Request Spot
 Ric the Raven
 Ring Raiders
 Road to Avonlea
 Robinson Sucroe
 Robotech
 Rocky Hollow
 Roobarb
 Roger Ramjet
 Rogue's Rock
 Romper Room
 Romuald the Reindeer
 Round the Bend
 Round the Twist
 Roustabout
 Rub-a-Dub-Dub
 Rude Dog and the Dweebs
 Runaway Bay
 The Rabbit with the Checkered Ears
 Sally and Jake
 Saved by the Bell (original series)
 See How They Grow
 Seven Little Australians
 Shadow of the Stone
 Shadows
 Sharky and George
 She-Ra: Princess of Power
 Simon in the Land of Chalk Drawings
 Silly Fairy Stories
 Skeleton Warriors
 Slip and Slap
 Smalls
 Son of Zorro
 Sonic the Hedgehog
 The Smoggies
 The Snow Spider
 Space Sentinels
 Spiff and Hercules
 Spirou
 The Square Leopard
 Stories Without Words
 Storytime
 Street Sharks
 Stunt Dawgs
 The Adventures of Super Mario Bros. 3
 The Super Mario Bros. Super Show!
 The Super Mario Challenge
 Super Mario World
 SuperTed
 Swamp Thing
 Swans Crossing
 Sweet Valley High
 Sylvanian Families
 The TCC Club
 Tech Talk
 Teddy Drop Ear
 Teddy Trucks
 Teenage Mutant Hero Turtles (UK title)
 Teen Wolf
 Telebugs
 The Telecat Show
 Thomas the Tank Engine and Friends
 The Three Mouseketeers
 The Tick
 The World of David the Gnome
 Tiny and Crew
 Towser
 Toxic Crusaders
 The Transformers
 The Trap Door
 Treehouse
 Tumbledown Farm
 Twinkle, the Dream Being
 The Twisted Tales of Felix the Cat
 Ulysses 31
 Under the Mountain
 Under the Umbrella Tree
 USA High

V–Z

 Victor & Maria
 Voltron: Defender of the Universe
 What-a-Mess
 Where's Wally?
 Whizzkid's Guide
 Widget
 Wil Cwac Cwac
 The Winners
 Wisdom of the Gnomes
 The Witches and the Grinnygog
 Wizbit
 The World of David the Gnome
 Worzel Gummidge
 Worzel Gummidge Down Under
 Wowser
 Wuzzles
 You Can't Do That on Television
 Zazoo U
 Zoobilee Zoo

Jack in the Box/Tiny TCC

 The Babaloos
 Babar
 Baby Follies
 Barney & Friends
 Bertha
 Bod
 Bump
 Button Moon
 The Care Bears Family
 Charlie Brown Specials
 Charlie Chalk
 Chorlton and the Wheelies
 Christopher Crocodile
 Clangers (original series 1-2 only)
 Cockleshell Bay
 Creepy Crawlers
 Crystal Tipps and Alistair
 Dappledown Farm
 Edward and Friends
 The Flumps
 The Forgotten Toys
 The Fruitties
 Gran
 Henry's Cat
 The Herbs
 Ivor the Engine
 James the Cat
 Johnson and Friends
 Kitty Cats
 The Little Green Man
 Morph
 Mr Benn
 Mister Men
 Nellie the Elephant
 Noddy
 Old Bear Stories
 Ovide and the Gang
 Papa Beaver's Storytime
 Philbert Frog
 Phillips
 Pinwheel
 Pob's Programme
 Potsworth & Co.
 Professor Bubble
 Professor Iris
 Puppydog Tales
 The Puzzle Place
 Rosie and Jim
 Sesame Street
 The Shoe People
 Special Sports
 Stoppit and Tidyup
 Strawberry Shortcake
 Titch
 Topsy and Tim
 Tots TV
 William's Wish Wellingtons
 The Wind in the Willows
 The Wombles

References

External links
 The Children's Channel at TV Ark
 TCC.co.uk from Web Archive

Mass media in Saudi Arabia
Mass media in the United Arab Emirates
Defunct television channels in the United Kingdom
Children's television channels in the United Kingdom
Television stations in Saudi Arabia
Television stations in the United Arab Emirates
1980s in Europe
1980s in British television
1990s in Europe
1990s in British television
Television channels and stations established in 1984
Television channels and stations disestablished in 2000
1984 establishments in the United Kingdom
1998 disestablishments in the United Kingdom
History of television in the United Kingdom
Satellite television